Jomar Brun MBE (18 June 1904 – 26 August 1993) was a Norwegian chemical engineer.

Career
Brun graduated from the Norwegian Institute of Technology in 1926, and worked for Norsk Hydro from 1929. He was central in the planning and running of the world's first industrial heavy water plant at Norsk Hydro Rjukan. During World War II he was called to London, and contributed to the planning phase of Operation Freshman and Operation Gunnerside, the heavy water sabotage at Vemork. He was decorated with the Order of the British Empire, and Officer of the French Legion of Honour. From 1951 he was appointed professor of electrochemistry at the Norwegian Institute of Technology in Trondheim.

Personal life
Brun was born in Trondheim on 18 June 1904, to Lorentz H. Brun and Ingrid Lysholm. He married Tomy Johanne Svingjom in 1941.

References

1904 births
1993 deaths
People from Trondheim
20th-century Norwegian engineers
Norwegian Institute of Technology alumni
Academic staff of the Norwegian Institute of Technology
Norwegian resistance members
Members of the Order of the British Empire
Officiers of the Légion d'honneur